Chersky (also anglicized Cherskiy) (Çerskey) is an urban locality (an urban-type settlement) and the administrative center of Nizhnekolymsky District of the Sakha Republic, Russia, located on the Kolyma River,  east from Yakutsk, the capital of the republic. As of the 2010 Census, its population was 2,857.

It was previously known as Nizhniye Kresty (until 1963). In 1989 the population of Chersky peaked on 11,176 inhabitants; however, like most Soviet settlements in the Arctic, it has been largely abandoned after the dissolution of the Soviet Union as most of its residents left. A similar depopulation happened in Magadan Oblast and Chukotka, and in lighter scale in the Russian Far East.

History
It was founded as Nizhniye Kresty in 1931. In 1963, it was granted urban-type settlement status and renamed Chersky, after Jan Czerski, a Polish geographer who organized several expeditions in the surrounding area in the 1880s. From the 1950s to the early 1990s, Chersky hosted logistical wing for drifting ice stations, which ran a supply route via the Zhokhov Island.

Administrative and municipal status
Within the framework of administrative divisions, the urban-type settlement of Chersky serves as the administrative center of Nizhnekolymsky District. As an administrative division, it is, together with one rural locality (the selo of Petushki), incorporated within Nizhnekolymsky District as the Settlement of Chersky. As a municipal division, the Settlement of Chersky is incorporated within Nizhnekolymsky Municipal District as Chersky Urban Settlement.

Economy
It is served by the Chersky Airport. Chersky is the home of the Northeast Science Station. In 1981, Sergey Zimov established here the Pleistocene Park, a place for studies of global warming, pleistocene ecology, and permafrost.

Climate
Despite being located inside the Arctic circle, Chersky has a subarctic climate (Köppen climate classification Dfc). Although severe, the climate sees less extremes in temperature than localities such as Yakutsk, Oymyakon and Verkhoyansk that are located more south, but further away from ocean. Summers are generally cool, although temperature may occasionally rise above 30 °C. Unusual for such a cold place, temperatures above 0 °C have been recorded in every month of the year.

References

Notes

Sources
Official website of the Sakha Republic. Registry of the Administrative-Territorial Divisions of the Sakha Republic. Nizhnekolymsky District.

External links
 Unofficial website of Chersky
AP article about Chersky

1931 establishments in Russia
Populated places established in 1931
Urban-type settlements in the Sakha Republic
Populated places of Arctic Russia
Road-inaccessible communities of the Sakha Republic
Kolyma basin